Francis Flaherty may refer to:

 Francis C. Flaherty (1919–1941), United States Naval Reserve officer and Medal of Honor recipient
 Francis Flaherty (judge) (born 1947), justice on the Rhode Island Supreme Court